This page covers all the important events in the sport of tennis in 2003. Primarily, it provides the results of notable tournaments throughout the year on both the ATP and WTA Tours, the Davis Cup, and the Fed Cup.

ITF

Grand Slam events

Davis Cup

Fed Cup

Hopman Cup

ATP
2003 ATP calendar

Tennis Masters Cup

ATP Masters Series

ARAG ATP World Team Championship
Final:
Team
Team

Year-End Top 10

Singles - Entry Ranking

Singles - Indesit ATP Race

WTA
2003 WTA calendar

WTA Tour Championships
Los Angeles, USA
Singles:  Kim Clijsters defeat   Amélie Mauresmo, 6-2, 6-0.
Doubles:  Virginia Ruano Pascual /  Paola Suárez defeat  Kim Clijsters /  Ai Sugiyama 6-4 3-6 6-3

WTA Tier I
Tokyo, Japan
Singles:  Lindsay Davenport d.  Monica Seles, 6-7(6-8), 6-1, 6-2.
Doubles:  Elena Bovina/ Rennae Stubbs d.  Lindsay Davenport/ Lisa Raymond 6–3, 6–4
Indian Wells, United States
Singles:  Kim Clijsters d. Lindsay Davenport, 6-4, 7-5.
Doubles:  Lindsay Davenport/ Lisa Raymond d.  Kim Clijsters/ Ai Sugiyama 2–6, 6–2, 7–6(5)
Miami, United States
Singles:  Serena Williams d.  Jennifer Capriati, 4-6, 6-4, 6-1.
Doubles:  Liezel Huber/ Magdalena Maleeva d.  Shinobu Asagoe/ Nana Miyagi  6–4, 3–6, 7–5
Charleston, United States
Singles:  Justine Henin d.  Serena Williams, 6-3, 6-4.
Doubles:  Virginia Ruano Pascual/ Paola Suárez d.  Janette Husárová/ Conchita Martínez 6–0, 6–3
Berlin, Germany
Singles:  Justine Henin d.  Kim Clijsters, 6-4, 4-6, 7-5.
Doubles:  Virginia Ruano Pascual/ Paola Suárez d.  Kim Clijsters/ Ai Sugiyama 6–3, 4–6, 6–4
Rome, Italy
Singles:  Kim Clijsters d.  Amélie Mauresmo, 3-6, 7-6(7-3), 6-0.
Doubles:  Svetlana Kuznetsova/ Martina Navratilova d.  Jelena Dokić/ Nadia Petrova 6–4, 5–7, 6–2
Toronto, Canada 
Singles:  Justine Henin d.  Lina Krasnoroutskaya, 6-1, 6-0.
Doubles:   Svetlana Kuznetsova/ Martina Navratilova d.  María Vento-Kabchi/ Angelique Widjaja 3–6, 6–1, 6–1
Moscow, Russia
Singles:  Anastasia Myskina d.  Amélie Mauresmo, 6-2, 6-4.
Doubles:  Nadia Petrova/ Meghann Shaughnessy d.  Anastasia Myskina/ Vera Zvonareva 6–3, 6–4
Zürich, Switzerland
Singles:  Justine Henin† d.  Jelena Dokić, 6-0, 6-4.
Doubles:  Kim Clijsters/ Ai Sugiyama d.  Virginia Ruano Pascual/ Paola Suárez 7–6(3), 6–2
† Henin became the 13th World #1 in the history of women's tennis after her victory in the Zurich Open final.

Retired
August
Pete Sampras (United States)

International Tennis Hall of Fame
Class of 2003:
Boris Becker, player
Françoise Dürr, player
Nancy Richey, player
Brian Tobin, contributor

Notes

 
Tennis by year